Thomas Urwin (5 February 1896 – 7 May 1968) was an English international footballer, who played as an outside forward.

Career
Born in Haswell, Urwin played professionally for Middlesbrough, Sunderland and Newcastle United, and earned four caps for England between 1923 and 1926.

Personal life 
Urwin served as a gunner in the Royal Field Artillery during the First World War and saw action at Gallipoli and in India.

References

1896 births
1968 deaths
English footballers
England international footballers
Middlesbrough F.C. players
Newcastle United F.C. players
Sunderland A.F.C. players
English Football League players
English Football League representative players
British Army personnel of World War I
Royal Field Artillery soldiers
Association football outside forwards
Shildon A.F.C. players
People from Haswell, County Durham
Footballers from County Durham